Careebeyans is a 2013 Indian Malayalam-language film, directed by Irshad and produced by Nanda Kumar. The film stars Kalabhavan Mani, Shweta Menon, Sai Kumar and Siddique in lead roles.

Cast
Kalabhavan Mani in a triple role as Minister Viswanathan, Charles and Charlie 
Shweta Menon 
Sai Kumar as Natarajan
Siddique as Iqbal
Suman
Janardanan as Balakrishnan
Lena

References

2013 films
2010s Malayalam-language films